The Devil on a Bench in Stanley Park is the second album by Canadian alt-country singer-songwriter Justin Rutledge, released on October 2, 2006, on Six Shooter Records. Recorded at a number of studios in Toronto, the album was produced by David Baxter and Justin Rutledge.

The album's positive critical reception prompted NOW magazine to name Rutledge as Toronto singer-songwriter of the year in 2006.

Track listing

References

External links
 Official site
 Six Shooter Records

2006 albums
Justin Rutledge albums
Six Shooter Records albums